Günther Russ was a  coaster that was built in 1921 by Stettiner Oderwerke AG, Stettin for German owners. She was seized by the Allies in May 1945, passed to the Ministry of War Transport (MoWT) and renamed Empire Condorrat. She was sold into merchant service in 1947 and renamed Kenton. In 1950, she was sold to West Germany and was renamed Günther Russ, serving until 1957 when she was scrapped.

Description
The ship was built in 1921 by Stettiner Oderwerke AG, Stettin.

She had a GRT of 998 and a NRT of 575. She had a DWT of 1,535.

The engine was built by Stettiner Oderwerke.

History
Günther Russ was built for Schiffart-und Assekuranz Gesellschaft GmbH. She was placed under the management of Ernst Russ, Hamburg. The Code Letters RBQD were allocated. In 1934, her Code Letters were changed to DHJP. In May 1945, Günther Russ was seized by the Allies. She was passed to the MoWT and renamed Empire Condorrat. She was operated under the management of Richard R Chester Ltd.

In 1947, Empire Condorrat was sold to Whitehaven Shipping Co, Whitehaven and was renamed Kenton. In 1950, she was sold to Ernst Russ, Hamburg and was renamed Günther Russ. She served until 1957 when she was scrapped in Hamburg.

References

External links
Photo of Günther Russ

1921 ships
Ships built in Stettin
Steamships of Germany
Merchant ships of Germany
World War II merchant ships of Germany
Ministry of War Transport ships
Empire ships
Steamships of the United Kingdom
Merchant ships of the United Kingdom
Steamships of West Germany
Merchant ships of West Germany